Kaido Kaaberma (born 18 November 1968) is an Estonian épée fencer.

Kaaberma won the bronze medal in the épée individual competition at the 1999 World Fencing Championships. He won a silver medal in 2001 with the Estonian épée team at the World Fencing Championships in Hungary.

Kaaberma won eight Estonian championships in épée fencing between the years 1988 and 2005. He has competed at the 1992, 1996 and 2000 Summer Olympics.

References

External links
 
 
 
 
 Results in sport-komplett.de

1968 births
Living people
Soviet male épée fencers
Estonian male épée fencers
Olympic fencers of Estonia
Sportspeople from Haapsalu
Fencers at the 1992 Summer Olympics
Fencers at the 1996 Summer Olympics
Fencers at the 2000 Summer Olympics